Charlotte Luise Antoinette von Schiller (née von Lengefeld; 22 November 1766 – 9 July 1826) was the wife of German poet Friedrich Schiller.

Early life
Lengefeld was born in Rudolstadt, Schwarzburg-Rudolstadt, into an aristocratic family, and given an education appropriate to a life at the ducal court of Weimar.<ref name="Lytton">Edward Bulwer-Lytton, "Life of Schiller," from Bulwer-Lytton's Miscellaneous Prose Works vol. 1 (New York: Harper and Brothers, 1868), 387-392.</ref>  Her father Carl Christoph von Lengefeld (1715–1775), who died when she was a young girl, had been a forest administrator of Louis Günther II, Prince of Schwarzburg-Rudolstadt, while her mother was Louise Juliane Eleonore Friederike von Wurmb (1743–1823). In her young adulthood she was introduced to the literary circles of Weimar.  She became friendly with Charlotte von Stein, who was at the center of the circle of Weimar Classicism as a friend of Schiller and sometime mistress of Johann Wolfgang von Goethe.  Stein confided in her throughout her complex relationship with Goethe. 

Her first love was a soldier, but after her family's opposition the engagement was dropped.

Marriage to Schiller

Lengefeld first met Schiller, then a little-known and impoverished poet, in 1785, through her older sister Caroline and her cousin Wilhelm von Wolzogen, who later became Caroline's second husband.  They began a correspondence in 1788, and, aided by the Lengefelds, Schiller took up residence near Rudolstadt shortly thereafter.  He seems to have made his affections clear to her that year, though they were confirmed to each by Caroline the following summer; Schiller wrote to Charlotte in August, 1789: "Am I to hope that Caroline read in your soul and answered from your heart what I did not dare to confess? Oh how hard it has been for me to keep this secret which I was obliged to do from the beginning of our acquaintance."

The precise nature of Schiller's relationship to the two sisters has been disputed.  In Caroline's later novel Agnes von Lilien, two women both pursue a relationship with a young baron, and critics have debated whether to understand the novel's love triangle as a reflection of Caroline, Charlotte, and Schiller (more recent critics are less inclined to do so). The letters later published from Schiller's correspondence with Charlotte are both deeply affectionate and literate; according to Edward Bulwer-Lytton, Lengefeld's admiration for Schiller's early work, particularly "The Artists," was important to their courtship.  They married on 20 February 1790.

The Schillers had four children: Karl Ludwig Friedrich (1793–1857), Ernst Friedrich Wilhelm (1796–1841), Karoline Luise Friederike Schiller (1799–1850), and Emilie Henriette Luise (1804–1872).

Works
Though never a published author during her lifetime, Lengefeld was a writer her entire life. Her letters to her husband, her sister, Stein, Goethe, and others have been published in multiple editions.  She has also been identified as the author of several works found among her husband's papers and posthumously included in collected editions alongside his work, notably the novel Die heimliche Heirat (The Secret Marriage'').  Along with other women in the Goethe-Schiller circle, Lengefeld has been receiving increased critical attention; critic Gaby Pailer wrote the first full-length scholarly book on her life and work, published in 2009.

See also
Beloved Sisters [Die geliebten Schwestern]. A 2014 German biographical film.

References

External links 

1766 births
1826 deaths
Friedrich Schiller
18th-century German novelists
19th-century German novelists
People from Rudolstadt
German women novelists